

Major international awards
 Golden Wreath of Struga Poetry Evenings
 Bridges of Struga (for a debuting author at Struga Poetry Evenings)
 Griffin Poetry Prize (The international prize)
 International Hippocrates Prize for Poetry and Medicine (Open First Prize=£5000)
 Montreal International Poetry Prize ($20,000 prize for one poem)
 National Poetry Competition (International, First Prize=£5000)
 Nobel Prize in Literature (Not exclusively for poetry)
 Poetic Republic Poetry Prize (Anonymous peer review poetry competition)
 Poetry London Prize (First Prize=£5000)
 Rhysling Award (For science-fiction poetry)
 Pushcart Prize  ("Best of the Small Presses")
 Charles Causley Trust International Poetry Competition (First Prize=£2000)
 Derek Walcott Prize for Poetry

Asia
 SAARC Literary Award

Africa
 Brunel University African Poetry Prize

Australia

 Anne Elder Award
 Bruce Dawe National Poetry Prize
 Christopher Brennan Award
 C. J. Dennis Prize for Poetry
 Grace Leven Prize for Poetry
 Harri Jones Memorial Prize for Poetry
 Judith Wright Prize
 Judith Wright Calanthe Award
 Kenneth Slessor Prize for Poetry
 Mary Gilmore Prize
 The Roland Robinson Literary Award
 Thomas Shapcott Poetry Prize
 The Val Vallis Award
 The W. B. Yeats Poetry Prize for Australia

Austria
 Feldkircher Lyrikpreis

Canada
 Aqua Books Lansdowne Prize for Poetry
 Archibald Lampman Award
 Atlantic Poetry Prize
 Dorothy Livesay Poetry Prize
 Gerald Lampert Award – for the best volume of poetry by a new author
 Griffin Poetry Prize – generous award for one Canadian and one foreign poet
 Pat Lowther Award – for the best volume of poetry written by a woman
 Prix Alain-Grandbois

Governor General's Awards
English language:
 Governor General's Award for English language poetry
 Governor General's Award for English language poetry or drama

French language:
 Governor General's Award for French language poetry
 Governor General's Award for French language poetry or drama

Chile
Premio Nacional de Literatura de Chile

Croatia
 Tin Ujević Award for contributions to Croatian poetry

Germany
 Wilhelm Busch Prize for satirical and humorous poetry

India 
 Saraswati Samman
 Sahitya Akademi Award given by Sahitya Akademi, India's National Academy of Letters
 Jnanpith Award
 Ananda Purashkar
 Kalidas Samman
 Pampa Award
 Rabindra Puraskar
 Karnataka Sahitya Akademi Award for Poetry
 Jibanananda Das Award
 All India Poetry Prize

Ireland
 Irish Times Poetry Now Award
 Patrick Kavanagh Poetry Award

Italy
Premio Viareggio
Premio Camaiore

Korea
 Kim Su-yông Contemporary Poetry Award

Malaysia
 Hadiah Sastera Perdana Malaysia
 Hadiah Sastera Kumpulan Utusan 
 Hadiah Sastera Majlis Sastera Asia Tenggara (Hadiah MASTERA)

Netherlands
 Awater Poëzieprijs
 C. Buddingh'-prijs
 J.C. Bloem-poëzieprijs
 Jan Campert Prize
 Jo Peters Poëzieprijs
 VSB Poetry Prize

New Zealand
 Montana New Zealand Book Award for Poetry
 Arts Foundation of New Zealand Icon, Laureate and New Generation Awards
 New Zealand Poet Laureate

Slovenia
 Jenko Award
 KONS International Literary Award
 Veronika Award
 Vilenica Prize

Spanish (language)
 Premio Adonais
 Premio Cervantes

United Kingdom

 Alice Hunt Bartlett Prize
 Brunel University African Poetry Prize
 Chancellor's Gold Medal
 Christopher Tower Poetry Prizes
 Cholmondeley Award
 Costa Poetry Award, formerly the Whitbread Poetry award
 Edwin Morgan Poetry Award
 E. H. P. Barnard Poetry Prize
 Eric Gregory Award
 Forward Prize
 Gaisford Prize
 Geoffrey Dearmer Award
 Geoffrey Faber Memorial Prize
 Hippocrates Prize for Poetry and Medicine (Open and NHS-related awards)
 Manchester Poetry Prize
 Michael Marks Poetry Awards
 National Poetry Competition
 Newdigate Prize
 Poetry Book Awards
 Popescu Prize
 Porson Prize
 Queen's Gold Medal for Poetry
 Sarah Maguire Prize
 T. S. Eliot Prize
 Welsh Poetry Competition

United States

 Agha Shahid Ali Poetry Prize – awarded annually in memory of this celebrated poet, sponsored by the University of Utah Department of English and the University of Utah Press
 Agnes Lynch Starrett Poetry Prize – for a first book of poetry
 Aiken Taylor Award for Modern American Poetry – annual prize, administered by the Sewanee Review and the University of the South, awarded to a writer who has had a substantial and distinguished career
 Alice James Award
 Amy Lowell Poetry Travelling Scholarship – given annually to a U.S.-born poet to spend one year outside North America in a country the recipient feels will most advance his or her work
 Autumn House Press – poetry and fiction awards for full-length book manuscripts
 Backwaters Press – annual prize awarded to book length manuscript selected by guest judge
 Bernard F. Connors Prize for Poetry – awarded by the editors of Paris Review for the best poem published in the magazine over the course of the year
 The Best American Poetry series – maximum of 75 poems published each year in the anthology series
 The Best New Poets series – maximum of 50 poems published each year in the anthology series
 Bobbitt National Prize for Poetry – offered by the Library of Congress for the best book of poetry published by a living U.S. author during the preceding two years
 Bollingen Prize – offered by Yale University every two years to one or more living U.S. poets for the best collection published in that period, or for lifetime achievement in poetry
 Borestone Mountain Poetry Awards – former series of annual anthologies (1948–1977) of poems selected as the best from each year's English-language magazines
 Brittingham Prize in Poetry
 Chelsea Award for Poetry – given by Chelsea magazine
 Cider Press Review Book Award – given by the Cider Press Review
 Crab Orchard Series in Poetry Open Competition Awards offers $3,500 for the first prize and $2,000 for the second prize
 Donald Justice Poetry Prize – sponsored by the Iris N. Spencer Poetry Awards at the West Chester University Poetry Center
 Dwarf Stars Award – annual award presented by the Science Fiction Poetry Association to the author of the best horror, fantasy, or science fiction poem of ten lines or fewer published in the previous year.
 Donna J. Stone National Literary Awards – sponsored by the Matthew J. Pascal Foundation and American Mothers, Inc.
 Felix Pollak Prize in Poetry
 Glascock Prize
 Howard Nemerov Sonnet Award
 Iowa Poetry Prize – sponsored by University of Iowa Press
 Isabella Gardner Poetry Award – sponsored by BOA Editions
 Jackson Poetry Prize - Honors an American poet of exceptional talent, sponsored by Poets & Writers; in 2022, carried an award of $80,000
 Julie Suk Award – awarded for Best Poetry Book by a Literary Press, sponsored by Jacar Press
 Kate Tufts Discovery Award – $10,000 awarded to a first time poet
 Kingsley Tufts Poetry Award – $100,000 award for poet in mid career
 Lambda Literary Award - for works which celebrate or explore LGBT themes
 Lannan Literary Award for Poetry – comes with $150,000
 Letter Review Prize for Poetry - $1000 USD + Publication First Prize. All entries considered for publication. 
 Los Angeles Times Book Prize in Poetry
 Maurice English Poetry Award – awarded for a volume of poetry published when a poet is more than 50 years old
 National Book Award for Poetry
 National Book Critics Circle Award – given annually in poetry and in five other categories to promote the finest books and reviews published in English
 National Poetry Series – offered by the National Poetry Series through five participating publishers for a collection of poetry
 The New Criterion Poetry Prize – given by The New Criterion magazine
 O. B. Hardison Jr. Poetry Prize – awarded by the Folger Shakespeare Library to a U.S. poet who has published at least one book within the last five years, has made important contributions as a teacher, and is committed to furthering the understanding of poetry
 PEN Award for Poetry in Translation – honoring a poetry translation published in the preceding year
 PEN/Voelcker Award for Poetry – given biennially to an American poet whose distinguished and growing body of work to date represents a notable and accomplished presence in American literature
 Poet Laureate Consultant in Poetry to the Library of Congress
 Poets' Prize – awarded annually for the best book of verse published by an American in the previous calendar year
 Pulitzer Prize for Poetry
 Rattle Poetry Prize – $5000 prize for one poem given every year by Rattle
 Rhysling Award – two given out each year (one for a long poem, the other for a short poem), by the Science Fiction Poetry Association for the best science fiction, fantasy, or horror poems
 Richard Wilbur Award
 Ruth Lilly Poetry Prize – offered by the Poetry Foundation for a U.S. poet "whose accomplishments warrant extraordinary recognition"
 T. S. Eliot Prize for Poetry – publication prize awarded annually by Truman State University for the best unpublished collection in English. A distinct prize with the same name is awarded in the United Kingdom
 Willis Barnstone Translation Prize – annual prize for an outstanding translation of a poem from any language into English
 Witter Bynner Fellowships – administered by the Library of Congress, the fellowships are sponsored by the Witter Bynner Foundation for Poetry, an organization that provides grant support for poetry programs through nonprofit organizations. Fellows are chosen by the Poet Laureate, and are expected to participate in a poetry reading at the Library of Congress in October and to organize a poetry reading in their respective cities
 Witter Bynner Poetry Prize – established by the American Academy of Arts and Letters in 1980 to support the work of a young poet
 Yale Series of Younger Poets – offered by Yale University Press to a poet under the age of forty for a first volume of poetry

Awards given by the Academy of American Poets
 Wallace Stevens Award – $100,000 to recognize outstanding and proven mastery in the art of poetry
 Fellowship of the Academy of American Poets – $25,000 for distinguished poetic achievement
 Lenore Marshall Poetry Prize – $25,000 for the best book of poetry published in the United States in the previous year
 James Laughlin Award – $5,000 to recognize and support a poet's second book
 Walt Whitman Award – first-book publication, $5,000, and a one-month residency at the Vermont Studio Center for an American who has not yet published a book of poetry
 Raiziss/de Palchi Translation Awards – $10,000 book prize and $25,000 fellowship, awarded in alternating years to recognize outstanding translations into English of modern Italian poetry
 Harold Morton Landon Translation Award – $1,000 for a published translation of poetry from any language into English

Awards given by the Poetry Society of America
 Alice Fay Di Castagnola Award
 Anna Rabinowitz Prize
 Cecil Hemley Memorial Award
 Frost Medal
 Four Quartets Prize
 George Bogin Memorial Award
 Lucille Medwick Memorial Award
 Lyric Poetry Award
 Norma Farber First Book Award
 Robert H. Winner Memorial Award
 Shelley Memorial Award – since 1929, offered by the society to a poet living in the United States who is chosen on the basis of "genius and need"
 Student Poetry Award
 William Carlos Williams Award – offered by the society for the best book of poetry published by a small, non-profit, or university press
 Writer Magazine/Emily Dickinson Award

Awards given by the American Academy of Arts and Letters
 American Academy of Arts and Letters Gold Medals for Poetry – given every six years to honor the distinguished career of a poet; considered the highest honor of the American Academy of Arts and Letters
 Arthur Rense Prize – in 1998, the $20,000 award was established to honor "an exceptional poet" once every third year
 Michael Braude Award for Light Verse – $5,000 biennial award is given "for light verse written in English regardless of the country of origin of the writer"
 Witter Bynner Poetry Prize – awarded by the American Academy of Arts and Letters from 1980 to 1993

See also 

 List of years in poetry
 List of literary awards
 List of years in literature

References 

Poetry
Poetry awards, List of